Opisthostoma vermiculum is a species of minute land snail with an operculum, a terrestrial gastropod mollusk or micromollusk in the family Diplommatinidae. 
The shell possesses four different coiling axes; the most for any known living gastropod. This member of the Diplommatinidae family is endemic to Malaysia. Its natural habitat is tropical limestone outcrops.

Shell description
When the species was discovered, thirty-eight specimens were collected: the shell shapes showed low variation.

This is the first snail reported that has a shell which shows four discernible coiling axes. The body whorls of the shell thrice detach and twice reattach to preceding whorls without any support. The detached whorls coil around three secondary axes in addition to their primary teleoconch axis. All specimens showed these features in a homogeneous way.

Opisthostoma vermiculum was selected as one of "The Top 10 New Species" described in 2008 by The International Institute for Species Exploration at Arizona State University and an international committee of taxonomists.

Conservation
These snails are found only on limestone karsts. There is significant quarring activities in the area, and this makes the species particularly vulnerable to extinction.

Etymology
The specific epithet, vermiculum, is derived from Latin, "meaning "wormy".

References

External links
 http://snailseyeview.blogspot.com/2008/01/opisthostoma-and-mad-womans-knitting.html

Endemic fauna of Malaysia
Invertebrates of Malaysia
Diplommatinidae
Gastropods described in 2008